The 1988 Calder Cup playoffs of the American Hockey League began on April 6, 1988. The eight teams that qualified, four from each division, played best-of-seven series for Division Semifinals and Division Finals. The division champions played a best-of-seven series for the Calder Cup.  The Calder Cup Final ended on May 12, 1988, with the Hershey Bears defeating the Fredericton Express four games to zero to win the Calder Cup for the seventh time in team history. Hershey went an unprecedented 12-0 during their Calder Cup run, which also set an AHL record for most consecutive games won in one playoff. Hershey's Wendell Young won the Jack A. Butterfield Trophy as AHL playoff MVP.

Playoff seeds
After the 1987–88 AHL regular season, the top four teams from each division qualified for the playoffs. The Hershey Bears finished the regular season with the best overall record.

Northern Division
Maine Mariners - 99 points
Fredericton Express - 95 points
Sherbrooke Canadiens - 89 points
Nova Scotia Oilers - 81 points

Southern Division
Hershey Bears - 105 points
Rochester Americans - 100 points
Adirondack Red Wings - 99 points
Binghamton Whalers - 87 points

Bracket

In each round, the team that earned more points during the regular season receives home ice advantage, meaning they receive the "extra" game on home-ice if the series reaches the maximum number of games. There is no set series format due to arena scheduling conflicts and travel considerations.

Division Semifinals 
Note: Home team is listed first.

Northern Division

(1) Maine Mariners vs. (4) Nova Scotia Oilers

(2) Fredericton Express vs. (3) Sherbrooke Canadiens

Southern Division

(1) Hershey Bears vs. (4) Binghamton Whalers

(2) Rochester Americans vs. (3) Adirondack Red Wings

Division Finals

Northern Division

(1) Maine Mariners vs. (2) Fredericton Express

Southern Division

(1) Hershey Bears vs. (3) Adirondack Red Wings

Calder Cup Final

(S1) Hershey Bears vs. (N2) Fredericton Express

See also
1987–88 AHL season
List of AHL seasons

References

Calder Cup
Calder Cup playoffs